Anglosuchus is an extinct genus of pholidosaurid mesoeucrocodylian.   Both species of Anglosuchus were originally assigned to the genus Steneosaurus by Richard Owen in 1884, but were later placed in the new genus. It was once thought to be a teleosaurid but later reassigned to the family Pholidosauridae.

References

Middle Jurassic crocodylomorphs
Middle Jurassic reptiles of Europe